Admiral Nakhimov is a 1947 Soviet biopic film directed by Vsevolod Pudovkin, based on the life of Russian Admiral Pavel Nakhimov (1802-1855). In 1946 Pudovkin, Golovnya, Lukovsky, Kryukov, Dikiy, Simonov, and Knyazev received the Stalin Prize.

Production 
The movie had to be remade after the Communist Party of the Soviet Union viewed it as having historical inaccuracies and too many "parties and dancing." Therefore, they recruited Vsevolod Pudovkin to recreate the film, where he removed the love story, "toned down" the dance scenes, and made other changes.

Plot

Cast

Response

Criticism
Stalin said this about the film: "Pudovkin, for instance, undertook the production of a film on Nakhimov without studying the details of the matter, and distorted historical truth. The result was a film not about Nakhimov but about balls and dances with episodes from the life of Nakhimov".

Awards
Award at the 8th Venice International Film Festival for the best crowd scenes, an honorary diploma for his performance as Nakhimov (Aleksei Dikiy)
Best Cinematography at the Locarno International Film Festival in 1947.
Stalin Prize I degree in 1947 (awarded to director Vsevolod Pudovkin, cinematographer Anatoli Golovnya, screenwriter Igor Lukowski, composer Nikolai Kryukov, actors Aleksei Dikiy, Ruben Simonov, Leonid Knyazev).

References

External links

1947 films
1940s biographical drama films
Crimean War films
Soviet biographical drama films
Russian biographical drama films
1940s historical drama films
Soviet historical drama films
Mosfilm films
Soviet black-and-white films
Films directed by Vsevolod Pudovkin
Russian black-and-white films
Russian historical drama films

Cultural depictions of Napoleon III
1940s Russian-language films